The Niols is a river in Perm Krai, Russia, a left tributary of the Vishera, which in turn is a tributary of the Kama. The source is located on the slope of the Urals, near the border with Sverdlovsk Oblast. It flows through Vishersky Nature Reserve and into the Vishera River  from the larger river's mouth.

References 

Rivers of Perm Krai